Pollicina is a genus of problematic conical, septate, gently spiralling shell assigned to the Mollusca. Classification to a smaller rank is not possible based on the limited characters displayed.

References

Prehistoric mollusc genera